Vrabec is a Slovak language, Czech language and Slovenian language surname, which means "sparrow". The female spelling of the name is Vrabcová and the German spelling is Wrabetz. A related name coming from Czech language roots with the same meaning is Brabec. Notable people with the surname include:

Alexander Wrabetz (born 1960), Austrian businessman
Eva Vrabcová-Nývltová (born 1986), Czech cross country skier 
Ivan Vrabec (born 1963), Slovak football player and manager
Petr Vrabec (born 1962), Czech football player and manager
Roland Vrabec (born 1974), German football manager
Thomas Vrabec (born 1966), Swiss ice hockey player

See also

References

Czech-language surnames
Surnames from nicknames